Caladenia crebra, commonly known as the Arrowsmith spider orchid is a species of orchid endemic to the  south-west of Western Australia. It has one or two relatively large, greenish-yellow flowers whose lateral sepals have thin brown "clubs" on their ends.

Description 
The flowers are greenish-yellow, sometimes with red markings. The sepals have thin brown "clubs"  on their ends. There are many densely crowded, dark purplish, finger-like "calli" crowded in distinct rows in the central part of the labellum. Flowering occurs from August to September. The fruit is a non-fleshy, dehiscent capsule containing a large number of seeds.

Taxonomy and naming
Caladenia crebra was first formally described by Alex George in 1971 and the description was published in Nuytsia from a specimen found south of Dongara. The specific epithet (crebra) is a Latin word meaning "crowded".

Distribution and habitat
The Arrowsmith spider orchid is widespread and common between Dongara and Jurien Bay in the Geraldton Sandplains and Swan Coastal Plain biogeographic regions. It grows in shallow, sandy soil in low forest and shrubland.

Conservation
Caladenia crebra is classified as "Not Threatened" by the Western Australian Government Department of Parks and Wildlife.

References

crebra
Orchids of Western Australia
Endemic orchids of Australia
Plants described in 1971
Endemic flora of Western Australia